McQuesten may refer to:

Jack McQuesten (1836–1909), American pioneer explorer, trader, and prospector in Alaska and Yukon
Mary Baker McQuesten (1849–1934), Victorian-era Canadian letter writer and activist
Thomas McQuesten (1882–1948), politician in Ontario, Canada

See also
McQuesten Airport (TC LID: CFP4) near McQuesten, Yukon, Canada
McQuesten, Yukon, an unincorporated community
McQuistan